Dempster is an unincorporated community in Hamlin County, in the U.S. state of South Dakota.

History
Dempster was platted in 1884. It was named for William Dempster, who owned the town site. A post office has been in operation in Dempster since 1884.

References

Unincorporated communities in Hamlin County, South Dakota
Unincorporated communities in South Dakota
1884 establishments in Dakota Territory